is a Japanese manga artist. In 1984, she won the Kodansha Manga Award for shōjo for Lady Love.

References

External links 
 Profile at The Ultimate Manga Guide

Manga artists
Women manga artists
Winner of Kodansha Manga Award (Shōjo)
Japanese female comics artists
Female comics writers
Living people
Japanese women writers
Year of birth missing (living people)